Aurintricarboxylic acid (ATA) is a chemical compound that readily polymerizes in aqueous solution, forming a stable free radical that inhibits protein-nucleic acid interactions. It is a potent inhibitor of ribonuclease and topoisomerase II by preventing the binding of the nucleic acid to the enzyme. It stimulates tyrosine phosphorylation processes including the Jak2/STAT5 pathway in NB2 lymphoma cells, ErbB4 in neuroblastoma cells, and MAP kinases, Shc proteins, phosphatidylinositide 3-kinase and phospholipase Cγ in PC12 cells. It also inhibits apoptosis. It prevents down-regulation of Ca2+-impermeable GluR2 receptors and inhibits calpain, a Ca2+-activated protease that is activated during apoptosis.

It is used to inhibit protein biosynthesis in its initial stages.  Nominally, it is used in biological experiments as a protein inhibitor, and as an ammonium salt (known as aluminon) it is used as a reagent to estimate the aluminium in water, biological tissue, and foods.

It was found that ATA is a strong inhibitor of topoisomerases and other nucleases. It might be useful for increasing efficiency of RNA isolation.

It has been discovered that using aurintricarboxylic acid against influenza-A post-infection has a strong protective effect by inhibiting the virus' ability to reproduce. In cultured canine kidney cells, it was found to reduce viral reproduction and infection when applied post-infection, but not when used as a 'vaccine'. It has also been shown to block the binding of the HIV coat molecule gp120 to the CD4 co-receptor on T cells through which it invades.

Aurintricarboxylic acid and its ammonium salt shows antiviral activity in vitro against coronaviruses such as SARS, MERS and SARS-CoV-2, and while it is unlikely to have suitable properties to be developed as a medicine in its own right, it has proved useful in scientific research into novel antiviral drugs to combat these diseases.

Preparation
Aurintricarboxylic acid can be prepared by the condensation of formaldehyde with salicylic acid in the presence of nitrite-containing sulfuric acid.

References 

Triarylmethane dyes
Salicylic acids
Phenol dyes
Tricarboxylic acids
Enoic acids
Bis(4-hydroxyphenyl)methanes